Symperga balyi is a species of beetle in the family Cerambycidae. It was described by Thomson in 1860. It is known from French Guiana.

References

Apomecynini
Beetles described in 1860